Perry Richardson (born July 7, 1958) is an American bass guitarist who played in FireHouse until 2000 and is currently the bassist of Stryper.

Biography 

Perry Richardson graduated Conway High School in Conway, South Carolina and went on to graduate from the University of South Carolina/Coastal Carolina in 1980 with Bachelor of Science degree in Business Management.

Richardson met C. J. Snare in North Carolina and started a band called Maxx Warrior. Eventually they met with Bill Leverty and Michael Foster (who were playing with a band called White Heat). The four got together in Charlotte and started FireHouse in 1989. While with the band, they sold over 7 million albums worldwide and won an American Music Award in 1991 for "Favorite New Artist Heavy Metal/Hard Rock". He was inducted into the South Carolina Entertainment Hall of Fame in 1995.

After leaving FireHouse in 2000, Richardson played bass for country music performers Craig Morgan and Trace Adkins.

On October 30, 2017 Christian metal band Stryper announced that Richardson would be their new bass player to replace Tim Gaines.

Discography

with Maxx Warrior 

 Maxx Warrior (1985)

with FireHouse 

 FireHouse (1990)
 Hold Your Fire (1992)
 3 (1995)
 Good Acoustics (1996)
 Category 5 (1998)
 Bring 'Em Out Live (1999)

 with Stryper 
 Even the Devil Believes (2020)
 The Final Battle'' (2022)

References 

1963 births
American Christians
American performers of Christian music
Living people
American rock bass guitarists
American male bass guitarists
FireHouse (band) members
20th-century American guitarists
Stryper members